In the modern history of Greece, starting from the Greek War of Independence, the Constitution of 1975/1986/2001 is the last in a series of democratically adopted Constitutions (with the exception of the Constitutions of 1968 and 1973 imposed by a dictatorship).

Greek War of Independence

During the Greek War of Independence, three constitutional texts (Constitutions of 1822, 1823 and 1827) were adopted by the Greek National Assemblies, the national representative political gatherings of the Greek revolutionaries. These constitutions were influenced by:

the French Constitutions of 1793 and 1795,
the French Declaration of the Rights of Man and of the Citizen,
the Draft Constitution of Rigas Velestinlis,
the three Constitutions of the Ionian Islands.

A year before the adoption of the Greek Constitution of 1822, local Assemblies had ratified the so-called Greek local statutes, such as the Senate Organization of Western Greece, the Legal Order of Eastern Greece and the Peloponnesian Senate Organization.

From the absolute to the constitutional monarchy (1833–1924)

King Otto governed for more than 10 years (including the first two years under a regency council) without any constitutional restrictions, since the "hegemonical" Greek Constitution of 1832 was never implemented. On 3 September 1843, the infantry, led by Colonel Dimitrios Kallergis and the Revolutionary captain Ioannis Makriyannis, assembled in the square in front of the palace in Athens. Eventually joined by much of the population of the small capital, the rebellion refused to disperse until the king agreed to grant a constitution. Left with little recourse, King Otto gave in to the pressure and agreed to the demands of the crowd over the objections of his opinionated Queen. This square was renamed to Constitution Square (Syntagma Square) to commemorate the events of September 1843.

The Greek Constitution of 1844 defined Greece as a constitutional monarchy, providing for a bicameral parliament, consisting of a Chamber of Deputies and a Senate. The Greek Constitution of 1864 was somewhat more liberal, and transferred most of the real power to the parliament. In 1874 Charilaos Trikoupis published a manifesto entitled "Who's to blame?" (Τίς πταίει;), naming King George I as the answer. Specifically, he condemned the king for bypassing parliamentary opinion in his selection of Prime Ministers. The article landed him briefly in jail, but also boosted his popularity significantly. A year later, on 8 May 1874 he mustered a parliamentary plurality and George reluctantly named him as Prime Minister. Thanks to Trikoupis' article, a new constitutional principle, the Principle of the Stated (Αρχή της Δεδηλωμένης) was recognized and implemented: the king was required to give the largest party in parliament first choice of forming a government. In 1911 Eleftherios Venizelos amended 54 non-fundamental of the 110 articles of the Constitution, trying to bring the constitution in line with his Liberal Party's principles. Nevertheless, the National schism of 1916 caused a huge constitutional crisis, as two governments were formed: one in Athens and one in Thessaloniki.

The Second Hellenic Republic and the Restoration (1925–1941)

The Constitution of 1925 provided for a Republic in accordance with the results of the plebiscite of 1924. Nonetheless, on 24 June 1925, officers loyal to Theodoros Pangalos, fearing that the political instability was putting the country at risk, overthrew the government in a coup and violated the Constitution. On 24 August 1926, a counter-coup deposed him and Pavlos Kountouriotis returned as president.

Since the previous Constitution was not fully implemented, it was the Constitution of 1927 which formally established the Second Hellenic Republic and provided for a largely ceremonial president as head of state.

After the plebiscite of 1935, King George II was restored, but the Third Revisionary Parliament of 1936 did not have the time to replace or amend the Constitution of the Republic. Instead, the Constitution of 1911 was restored, ostensibly on a temporary basis.  The elections of 1936 had produced a political deadlock and, thereby, George II appointed Ioannis Metaxas to be interim prime minister. Widespread industrial unrest in May allowed Metaxas to declare a state of emergency.  On 4 August, he suspended the parliament indefinitely and suspended various articles of the constitution, with the king's approval. For all intents and purposes, Metaxas was now a dictator.  No constitutional amendment was adopted before Germany invaded Greece in 1941.

The Kingdom of Greece after the Second World War (1942–1967)
After the end of the Second World War, King George II was once again restored by virtue of the plebiscite of 1946. The implications of the Greek Civil War did not allow the ratification of the liberal Draft Constitution of 1948. A more conservative Constitution was passed in 1952, which imposed restrictions on basic human rights and banned the Communist Party of Greece (KKE).

The Colonels' Regime (1967–1974)
On 21 April 1967, a coup took place by right-wing officers, which established a dictatorship known as the Colonels' Regime. An attempted counter-coup by King Constantine II in December failed, forcing him to leave the country. Thus, legally, there was no government and no Head of State in Athens. Thereby, the Revolutionary Council of Stylianos Pattakos, George Papadopoulos and Nikolaos Makarezos made a brief appearance to cause a Resolution to be published in the Government Gazette, appointing another member to the military administration, Major General Georgios Zoitakis, as Regent. Zoitakis then appointed Papadopoulos as Prime Minister. A new constitution was adopted by referendum in 1968.  King Constantine was officially retained as head of state, though he would not be allowed to return until the first parliamentary election unless the government recalled him sooner.  Many of the guarantees of civil rights were suspended, and elections were postponed until the "Revolution of April 21" (as the coup was called) had reformed the "Greek mentality."

Five years later, during Papadopoulos' attempts at controlled democratization, he abolished the monarchy and declared Greece a republic with himself as president.  A plebiscite formally abolished the monarchy on 29 July 1973. A new Constitution was drafted, providing for a popularly elected president with wide-ranging powers, effectively establishing a presidential republic. After the hard-liners' coup on 25 November 1973 deposed Papadopoulos, the regime retained the trappings of the Republic, but reverted to exclusively military control until its final collapse in the wake of the Cyprus crisis in August 1974.

The Third Hellenic Republic
With the return of civilian rule under Constantine Karamanlis, the new government, acting under extraordinary circumstances, issued a "Constituting Act" which voided the 1973 constitution.  Pending a referendum on a new constitution, the 1952 constitution was temporarily restored, "except for the articles dealing with the form of the State"; the last phrase referring to whether the monarchy would be restored or not. In the meantime, the functions of the king were to be discharged by the incumbent President of the Republic General Phaedon Gizikis who was appointed by the Ioannides' short-lived regime as a nominal figurehead. 

The matter was settled by plebiscite on 8 December 1974, by which the monarchy was definitively abolished. A new Constitution, adopted by Parliament and promulgated on 11 June 1975, established a parliamentary democracy with a president as head of state.  In practice, however, most of the power was vested in the prime minister.  This constitution was revised in 1985 to codify this practice.  It was amended again in 2001, in 2008 and in 2019 and is in force today.

List of Greek Constitutions
In a chronological order, the Greek Constitutions are:

Greek Constitution of 1822
Greek Constitution of 1823
Greek Constitution of 1827
Greek Constitution of 1832
Greek Constitution of 1844
Greek Constitution of 1864
Greek Constitution of 1911
Greek Constitution of 1925
Greek Constitution of 1927
Draft Constitution of 1948
Greek Constitution of 1952 pdf
Greek Constitution of 1968
Greek Constitution of 1973
Greek Constitution of 1975/1986/2001/2008/2019

See also
History of the Hellenic Republic

Notes

External links
 Hellenic Parliament – Constitutional history of Greece
 Hellenic Parliament – Past constitutions and constitutional charters

Constitution of Greece
Political history of Greece
Greece